Engineering College, Ajmer, (formerly known as Govt. Engineering College) is an autonomous institute of the Government of Rajasthan located at Badaliya Chouraha, beside N.H 8, Ajmer, Rajasthan, India. It was established in 1997. The college campus is situated in the lap of Aravalli mountain range and surrounded by many hills. It spread over 300 acres of land, away from the hustle and bustle of the city in a calm and serene environment adorned by Nareli Jain temples. A six-lane road connecting Jaipur and Jodhpur passes just opposite to the college. This might sounds beautiful but in reality, there is nothing but wild area.  Approx, more than 95% of land is still unused where anything can be constructed but there is nothing for the proper development of students, even a proper playground is not available in the college campus.

It is a perfect amalgamation of innovation, inspiration and synergy and aims to be a model institution for students across disciplines and programmes. Since its inception it has been promoting and encouraging research based experiential learning among all the students. It is one of the leading technical institutes in Rajasthan known for quality education (still not having enough ELCTRICAL BRANCH teachers to conduct classes) , state of the art infrastructure, modern and well equipped laboratories and a well established library.

The campus is well constructed with several blocks which include the Main Building which houses the administrative block , Department of Computer Science and Information Technology and the Department of Masters in Computer Application. The New Building has the Department of Applied Sciences and Humanities, Department of Electronics and Communication Engineering, Department of Mechanical Engineering and Department of Management Studies. Civil cum Electrical block dedicated to Civil and Electrical brach. Apart from it, Central Library, Mechanical Workshop, Guest house and Girl's Hostel are also available.

It is a ecofriendly and hitech campus with Wifi facility throughout the premises. Carbon footprints are controlled using Solar Power Plant of 210 kW capacity which has been installed under RESCO mode by AZURE Rooftop One Pvt.Ltd and is functional since 2018. The plant generates on an average 840 kWh per day (306 MWh per year) and mitigates approximately 254 tonnes of carbondioxide annually (assuming emission factor of 0.83-CO2 per kWh).
	
There is NO hostel for boys & girls(General/OBC) but 50 seated hostel is available for girls belongs to SC/ST category. It is a Wi-Fi campus but fact is that students are only allowed to browse or download some basic contents (e.g Software), even trusted and famous educational sited are BLOCKED from access many necessary kinds of stuff like latest software, video contents, etc. Students and teachers work together to make it a complete anti-ragging campus.
	
Notably, The average placement package is around 3.5 lac/year 	
and the actual placement rate is about 10% to 25% in the recent years. Visit here to see records >> [ECAjmer :: http://tpo.ecajmer.ac.in/PlacementRecords.php] .

Department 
ECA has Eleven departments, each led by a Head of Department. Each department offers a program at undergraduate and postgraduate level.
The academic departments of ECA are:
 Computer Science And Engineering (Cyber Security)
 Information Technology
 Computer Engineering
 Civil Engineering
 Mechanical Engineering
 Electronics and Communication Engineering
 Electrical Engineering
 Electronics Instrumentation And Control Engineering
 Master Of Computer Applications
 Master Of Business Administration  
 Department of Humanities and Social Science

Computer Enginnering

Computer Science and Engineering was established in the August 2000. The primary goal of CSE is to provide best IT infrastructure, world class learning & research environment, adopt industry practices through industry collaborations and inculcate moral and ethical values. The department is accredited by NBA. The alacrity of the students to learn makes it easier for the industry-trained experienced faculty to produce top-notch engineers who are being recruited by reputed companies all over the world.
At present, the department is having a 17 regular faculty, whose interests span in almost all areas of Computer Science. Computer Science and Engineering department is having 9 Computer Labs and a Central Computer Center with latest computer configuration. Each lab is having capacity of 30 computers and Center is having capacity of 100 computers. All the computers are connected in local area network (wired and wireless) with Internet Connection of 1Gbps leased line link and 100 Mbps 1:1 bandwidth. Highly configured servers have been installed. Department is also having the latest CISCO routers and switches for networking.

Vision
To produce competent professionals in the field of computer science and engineering.

Mission
Prepare the students with strong fundamental concepts, analytical capability, programming, problem solving skills and strong ethics.
Provide opportunities to promote organizational and leadership skills in students.
To disseminate digital innovation among society.

Expertise
The department has experienced faculty members specialized in Compiler Design, Artificial Intelligence, Distributed Computing, Multimedia, RDBMS, Computer Networks, Data Communication, OOPS, Data Structures and Algorithm, Software Engineering, Operating Systems, Network Security, High Speed Networks, Theory of Computation, Mobile Computing, Design and Analysis of Algorithm and Data Mining etc.

Facilities 
 Laboratories
 Research facilities
 Computer center
 Sports complex
 SAEINDIA Collegiate Club

Achievements 
https://ecajmer.ac.in/media_news

Campus Placement 
 http://tpo.ecajmer.ac.in

Library 
The library of ECA has international and national journals on science, engineering, management, humanities, and literature. The total number of books and journals exceeds 100,000. The library has a collection of academic text-books, peer-reviewed papers, and research material.

SAEINDIA Collegiate Club 
SAEINDIA Club of Engineering College Ajmer (GECA), was founded on 10 October 2015, due to much effort by Sh. Vinod Kumar Verma , Assistant Prof. Mechanical Engg. (founder of the club) with 84 student members. The club's aim is to focus on those students who are interested to make their career in automobile sector, railway, aeronautics, etc. or even for those who are eager to know and to learn about cars, bikes, etc.

SAE INDIA GECA Collegiate Club is working to create lasting change in the standards of learning in automobile field. Club is also focusing on student’s competitions like Baja, Supra, Epicycle etc. on national and international levels. Apart from this, Club is also involved in various social activities like free public car and bike checkup camps, plantations, blood donation. etc. to serve social responsibilities.

All of us are inclined towards the help this generation of students but not everyone takes that one step to go forward and help them. Here SAE INDIA GECA Club plays the most significant role in enabling the students to channelize and unite to help themselves and other student. But let us not stop with just joining the club; let us spread this good news and work of club with others to encourage students to perform best in their lives.
 SAEINDIA GECA Page Link

References 

 Technical education
 Bikaner Technical University, Bikaner 
 Rajasthan Technical University, Kota
 Engineering Colleges in Rajasthan

External links
 Official Website
 SAEINDIA GECA Facebook Page
 National Conference
 Education in Rajasthan

Engineering colleges in Ajmer
Educational institutions established in 1997
1997 establishments in Rajasthan